Ernst Hollstein (9 December 1886 in Karlsruhe – 9 August 1950) was a German amateur football (soccer) player who competed in the 1912 Summer Olympics. He was a member of the German Olympic squad and played one match in the main tournament as well as in the consolation tournament.

References

External links

1886 births
1950 deaths
German footballers
Germany international footballers
Olympic footballers of Germany
Footballers at the 1912 Summer Olympics
Karlsruher FV players
Footballers from Karlsruhe
German footballers needing infoboxes
Association football defenders